Owen Harding disappeared at the age of 16 from Saltdean, England, where he lived. Nothing has been heard from him since his disappearance on 26 March 2020.

Background 
Harding was described at the time as being roughly 6 ft in height and had dark brown hair, which was short. He was usually seen wearing tracksuit bottoms, hoodies of a dark colour and white trainers.

According to his mother, Stella, Harding was a valued member of the local community. From his school teachers and college friends, to the people he played football with, Harding was respected by those who knew him.

Disappearance 

After the argument, Harding left the family home that evening, heading to Telscombe where he intended to watch the sunset, according to his mother, Stella. However he never returned home and nobody who knew him has received any form of contact from him since.
It's thought that Harding may have attempted to walk from his hometown of Saltdean to his girlfriend's house in Pocklington, which would have been 280 miles on foot.

Investigation 

Two witnesses came forward, reporting to Sussex Police that they saw a boy who matched Harding's description at roughly 6.15pm and 6.30pm, walking beside the A259 road. A picture taken from closed-circuit television cameras placed Harding in Bannings Vale at roughly 6:50. Searches were carried out at the cliffs in Saltdean and Telscombe. CCTV footage released from East Sussex Police revealed two people whom officers urged to come forward as they believed it was possible that they may have witnessed something that day which could help them with their inquiries.

CCTV footage revealed that Harding was walking directly towards a path along the side of the cliffs. His girlfriend disclosed she spoke to Harding on her phone at the time he was heading towards the cliffs. Harding was unable to be reached on his phone from around 6.23pm. Harding's mother has not ruled out the possibility of a tragic accident. Simon Boxall, an oceanographer, has estimated that due to the weather conditions on that day, and the fact that the tide was low, it was likely a body would have been carried out to sea.

Alasdair Henry, the detective chief inspector who was investigating Harding's disappearance, released information concerning Harding's phone and the possibility of it being in Bromley or the West Wickham part of London.

Harding's mother, Stella, appeared on the Channel 4 documentary The Year Britain Stopped. She believes that if it were not for the first lockdown back in 2020, her son would probably still be here today.

See also
 List of people who disappeared

References 

Missing English children
2020s missing person cases
COVID-19 pandemic in England
People from Saltdean
2003 births
Living people
March 2020 events in the United Kingdom
History of Brighton and Hove